Maqsudabad-e Bala may refer to:
 Maqsudabad-e Bala, Razavi Khorasan
 Maqsudabad-e Bala, West Azerbaijan